The 2008 Jos riots were riots involving Christians and Muslims over the result of a local election on 28 and 29 November 2008 in Jos, a city in the Middle Belt region of Nigeria. Two days of rioting left hundreds injured and at least 761 dead. The Nigerian army was deployed and by 30 November order was restored.

Causes
Electoral workers did not publicly list the winners of the elections, and rumours began that the election was won by the candidate of the People's Democratic Party (PDP), barrister Timothy Gyang Buba, defeating the candidate for the All Nigerian Peoples Party. People from the largely Muslim Hausa community, began protesting even before the results were released, which results to clash that claims hundred of lives between the Muslims and Christians, who largely supported Buba.

Similar riots in 2001 between Christians and Muslims in Jos also killed hundreds. A 2004 riot in Yelwa, another town in Plateau State resulted in the so-called Yelwa Massacre. Fighting in the north-central Kaduna State when it tried to impose shari'a law in 2000, resulted in the partition of Kaduna. This was followed by the Kaduna riots of November 2002, resulting from Nigeria's hosting of the Miss World contest, which one of its contestants had won the previous year.

Riots
The two days of rioting led to the death of at least 761 people, and homes, mosques, churches and schools were damaged or burned by mobs. The Nigerian Red Cross Society reported that 10,000 people fled their homes due to the riots, and were living in government-provided shelters. Nigerian soldiers were sent into Jos to break up the fighting and create a buffer zone between the Christians and Muslims. Flights to and from Jos were cancelled and roads to the north were blocked.

Effects
Jonah Jang, the governor of the Plateau State, imposed a 24-hour curfew on four districts of the city, and soldiers were permitted to "shoot on sight" to prevent more violence. Human Rights Watch alleged that soldiers and police carried out more than 130 extrajudicial killings while responding to the riots. Many armed youths of both sides were arrested at military roadblocks. Police reported that more than 500 people were arrested as a result of the riots. But state officials said no one was successfully prosecuted.

See also
 2001 Jos riots
 2010 Jos riots

References

External links
 Blench, R. M., Daniel, P. & Hassan, Umaru (2003): Access rights and conflict over common pool resources in three states in Nigeria. Report to Conflict Resolution Unit, World Bank (extracted section on Jos Plateau)
 Human Rights Watch (2009), Arbitrary Killings by Security Forces: Submission to the Investigative Bodies on the November 28-29, 2008 Violence in Jos, Plateau State, Nigeria
 Human Rights Watch (2013), "Leave Everything to God": Accountability for Inter-Communal Violence in Plateau and Kaduna States, Nigeria 
 Nkwocha, Stanley (1 December 2008). Jos: Blood On Its Streets, Again, Leadership (Abuja)
 Ostien, Philip (2009), [http://www.sharia-in-africa.net/media/publications/ethno-religious-conflict-in-Jos-Nigeria/Ostien_Jos.pdf Jonah Jang and the Jasawa: Ethno-Religious Conflict in Jos, Nigeria], in Muslim-Christian Relations in Africa''

2008 murders in Nigeria
2008 in Nigeria
2008 riots
Political riots
Religious riots in Nigeria
2000s massacres in Nigeria
Riots and civil disorder in Nigeria
Jos
Attacks on religious buildings and structures in Nigeria
November 2008 events in Africa
2008 murders in Africa